Ray Pierce may refer to:

 Ray V. Pierce (1840–1914), U.S. Representative from New York
 Ray Pierce (baseball) (1897–1963), American baseball player